APO-Source - The African News Source is the online database of news releases of the African Press Organization (APO). Started in 2007, APO-Source offers free access to tens of thousands of Africa-related news releases themed by country, industry and subject.

Working Method
The African Press Organization distributes an average of 20,000 Africa-related news releases a year. These releases are indexed by 135 categories -country, industry and subject, institution name- and offered for free to International and African journalists.

The journalists can then run searches by key-word, date, country, industry and subject or institution name. They can also choose to receive the news releases by RSS feed, email, FTP or widgets.

This online database of news releases is updated hourly, from Monday to Friday and comprises releases in several languages including French, English, Arabic, Portuguese, Spanish or even Norwegian.

APO-Source is part of  Africa Wire® the service for press release wire distribution in Africa offered by the African Press Organization, global leader in news distribution related to Africa.

In October 2015, APO-Source has been replaced by Africa-Newsroom.com.

References

External links
 APO-Source - The African News Source
 Website of the African Press Organization

Journalism organizations
African journalism